Colobopsis ceylonica is a species of formicine ant. It is found from Sri Lanka.

References

External links

ceylonica
Hymenoptera of Asia
Insects of Sri Lanka
Taxa named by Carlo Emery
Insects described in 1925